Jackson Wink MMA Academy (formerly known as Jackson's Submission Fighting) is a mixed martial arts gym based in Albuquerque, New Mexico. The gym has been featured in several sports documentaries and has been called one of the best MMA gyms in the world by various MMA magazines.

History 

In 1992, after graduating from Rio Grande High School, Greg Jackson founded his own martial art, Gaidojutsu, which combines rudimentary techniques from catch wrestling and Muay Thai with basic judo locks. His school officially turned into an MMA school in 2000. The gym started gaining notoriety when Diego Sanchez won the first Ultimate Fighter in 2005.

In 2007 Jackson teamed up with long time friend and collaborator, and fellow martial artist, Mike Winkeljohn to create the academy as it stands today. Winkeljohn is former professional kickboxer with a record of 25–7–2 who captured two International Sport Karate Association Championships and one Muay Thai world title.

In December 2019, Jackson and Winklejohn announced they would begin entertaining naming rights offers for their training facility Albuquerque, New Mexico however a price wasn't given. Jackson also announced they will begin offering mixed martial arts fans a chance to travel to Albuquerque, New Mexico and train like his gym's fighters. He said prices for personalized MMA packages would vary and stays could last a week to two weeks at a time.

Due to COVID-19, in March 2020, Jackson Wink MMA Academy announced it would be adjusting its training. This includes moving to "more striking-based training” to curtail contact among fighters as well as preventing anyone who was sick or may have had exposure to COVID-19 from training at the facility.

Incidents

Fighters 
Due to the large size of the gym, there have been occasions where fighters would be booked to fight against each other professionally. This has caused internal conflicts within the gym.

In March 2011, Rashad Evans announced that he was done training at Jackson-Wink MMA Academy. Originally, Evans was slated to fight Maurício Rua for the UFC Light Heavyweight title at UFC 128. However Evans injured his knee during training and was replaced by Jon Jones, who was from the same gym and would eventually go on to defeat Rua to win the title. When Evans and Jones were slated to fight, the gym decided to side with Jones and corner him at UFC 145. Evans considered this as the gym turning its back on its older fighters in favor of younger ones. Evans would eventually move to the Blackzilians.

In August 2018, Donald Cerrone left Jackson-Wink MMA Academy to open his own training center on his ranch. It all came after Cerrone was signed to fight his fellow welterweight, Mike Perry, who was a newcomer to the same gym. Cerrone requested that his coaches solely focus on him due to his long-standing status as a Jackson-Wink fighter. However, according to Cerrone on The Joe Rogan Experience podcast, Winklejohn told him the gym decided to side with Perry which angered Cerrone. Cerrone went on to criticize the modern-day Jackson-Wink MMA Academy, citing problems he has with the day-to-day running of the gym as one of the reasons behind his decision to open his own training center on his ranch – something he also feels caused increased tension.

Other examples include Georges St-Pierre defending his title against Carlos Condit, as well as Andrei Arlovski being booked to fight against Alistair Overeem.

In October 2021, Jon Jones was banned from the Jackson Wink MMA Academy as a result of his arrest stemming from domestic violence against his fiancée.

QAnon flag found on roof 
In June 2020, a QAnon flag was discovered on the roof of the gym's building. The flag was first revealed by Albuquerque city councilor Pat Davis, who posted a picture of a white flag with a black Q perched atop the academy's roof. Shortly following Davis's post, the Jackson-Wink MMA Academy removed the flag and released a statement on social media stating it denounces all hate groups and militia violence.

Notable fighters 
(Bold denotes current and past UFC champions)

 Adlan Amagov (UFC)
 Ali Bagautinov (UFC) - Former UFC Flyweight Title Challenger
 Alistair Overeem (UFC) - Former Strikeforce Heavyweight Champion, 2010 K-1 Grand Prix Champion
 Andrei Arlovski (UFC) - Former UFC 2-Time Heavyweight Champion
 B.J. Penn (UFC)- Former UFC Lightweight Champion and UFC Welterweight Champion
 Carlos Condit  (UFC) - Former Welterweight Title Contender and Challenger, Former UFC Interim Welterweight Champion, Former WEC Welterweight Champion
 Claressa Shields (PFL) - Two time Olympic Boxing Gold Medalist, undisputed boxing female middleweight champion from 2019 to September 2020
 Clay Guida (UFC) - Former Strikeforce Lightweight Champion
 Cub Swanson (UFC)
 Derek Brunson (UFC)
 Diego Sanchez (UFC) - UFC Lightweight Title Challenger, TUF 1 Welterweight Winner
 Donald Cerrone (UFC) - Former WEC Lightweight Title Challenger
 Erik Perez (UFC)
 Frank Mir (UFC)- Former UFC Heavyweight Champion
 Georges St-Pierre (UFC) - Former UFC Welterweight and Middleweight Champion, 10 title defenses
 Gina Carano (Strikeforce)
 Holly Holm (UFC) - Former UFC Women's Bantamweight Champion
 Joe Stevenson (RFA) - Former UFC Lightweight Title Challenger, TUF 2 Welterweight Winner
 John Dodson (UFC) - Former UFC Flyweight Title Challenger, TUF 14 Bantamweight Winner

 Jon Jones (UFC) 2 Time UFC Light Heavyweight Champion and current UFC Heavyweight Champion
 Julie Kedzie (Retired)
 Keith Jardine (UFC) - Former Strikeforce Middleweight Title Challenger
 Kyle Noke (UFC)
 Lando Vannata (UFC)
 Leonard Garcia (Retired) - Former WEC Featherweight Title Challenger
 Michelle Waterson (UFC) - Former Invicta Atomweight Champion
 Nate Marquardt (UFC) - Former Strikeforce Welterweight Champion, Former UFC Middleweight Title Challenger, Former Pancrase Middleweight Champion
 Omari Akhmedov (UFC)
 Rashad Evans (UFC) - Former UFC Light Heavyweight Champion, The Ultimate Fighter season 2 winner
Ray Borg (UFC)
 Roger Huerta (One FC)
 Rustam Khabilov (UFC)
 Sarah Kaufman (UFC) - Former Strikeforce Women's Bantamweight Champion
 Tara LaRosa
 Tim Kennedy (UFC) - (Retired) Former Strikeforce Middleweight Title Challenger
Tim Means (UFC)
Tony Ferguson (UFC) - Former UFC Interim Lightweight Champion
 Vitaly Minakov (Bellator MMA) - Former Bellator Heavyweight Champion, 4-Time World Sambo Champion +100 kg
 Yoshihiro Akiyama (UFC)

Awards 
World MMA Awards
 2015 Gym of the Year
 2011 Coach of the Year: Greg Jackson
 2010 Coach of the Year: Greg Jackson
 2009 Gym of the Year
 2009 Coach of the Year: Greg Jackson

See also
List of Top Professional MMA Training Camps

References

External links 
 Official website

Mixed martial arts training facilities
Sports in Albuquerque, New Mexico